Welford Road may refer to:

 Welford Road Cemetery, Leicester, England
 Welford Road Stadium, a rugby union stadium in Leicester, England
 Welford Road railway station, a former railway station (until 1918) in Leicester, England